Robert Donnell Sowell, Jr. (June 23, 1961 – June 22, 2015) was a professional American football player who played defensive back in the National Football League (NFL) for the Miami Dolphins. He died June 22, 2015, of a heart attack. He was employed at UPS.

References

1961 births
American football safeties
Howard Bison football players
Miami Dolphins players
2015 deaths
National Football League replacement players